Lesotho competed in  Manchester in 2002 in their seventh games. The nation did not repeat their performance in  Kuala Lumpur 1998 where they won their first medal, a gold, but did manage to win a shared bronze with England in boxing.

Bronze
Boxing:
 Ezekiel Letuka Men's bantamweight division (54kg)

See also
2002 Commonwealth Games results

References

2002
2002 in Lesotho sport
Nations at the 2002 Commonwealth Games